Bryan W. Shupe is an American politician. He is a Republican member of the Delaware House of Representatives. He represents District 36, which includes south Milford, Ellendale, and Slaughter Beach. In 2018, Shupe was elected after winning the general election against Democratic nominee Don Allan. Prior to being elected to the Delaware House of Representatives, Shupe had served as mayor of the city of Milford.

References

External links
Official page at the Delaware General Assembly
Campaign site
 

Living people
People from Milford, Delaware
Mayors of places in Delaware
Republican Party members of the Delaware House of Representatives
21st-century American politicians
Year of birth missing (living people)